The 2019 Sokoto State House of Assembly election was held on March 9, 2019, to elect members of the Sokoto State House of Assembly in Nigeria. All the 30 seats were up for election in the Sokoto State House of Assembly.

Aminu Achida from APC representing Wurno constituency was elected Speaker, while Abubakar Magaji from PDP representing Bodinga North constituency was elected Deputy Speaker.

Results 
The result of the election is listed below.

 Aminu Magaji from APC won Dange/Shuni constituency
 Mustapha Abdullahi from APC won Sokoto South I constituency
 Malami Ahmed from PDP won Sokoto South II constituency
 Suke Romo from PDP won Tambuwal West constituency
 Mode Ladan PDP Tambuwal East constituency
 Musa Miko from PDP won Tangaza constituency
 Murtala Maigona from APC won Wamakko constituency
 Aminu Achida from APC won Wurno constituency
 Shehu Yabo from APC won Yabo constituency
 Haliru Buhari from PDP won Sokoto North I constituency
 Ibrahim Arzika from PDP won Sokoto North II constituency
 Abdullahi Randa from PDP won Tureta constituency
 Umaru Sahabi from PDP won Binji constituency
 Abubakar Magaji from PDP won Bodinga North constituency
 Bala Tukur from APC won Bodinga South constituency
 Altine Kyadawa from APC won Gada West constituency
 Kabiru Dauda from APC won Bada East constituency
 Mustapha Balle from PDP won Gudu constituency
 Bello Idris from APC won Gwadabawa South constituency
 Abdullahi Garba from APC won Gwadabawa North constituency
 Bello Ambarura from APC won Illela constituency
 Habibu Modachi from PDP won Isa constituency
 Abdullahi Mahmud from PDP won Kware constituency
 Abdullahi Zakari from APC won Rabah constituency
 Almustapha Aminu from PDP won Sabon Birni North constituency
 Saidu Ibrahim from APC won Sabon Birni South constituency
 Alhaji Maidawa from APC won Shagari constituency
 Atiku Liman from PDP won Silame constituency
 Isa Harisu from APC won Kebbe constituency
 Faruku Amadu from APC won Goronyo

References 

Sokoto
2019 Sokoto State elections